Nils Gustaf Regnell (18 December 1884 – 14 November 1950) was a Swedish freestyle swimmer. He competed at the 1906 Intercalated Games in the one mile and 4×250 m events and finished fifth in the relay. His younger sisters Elsa and Lisa were Olympic divers.

References

1884 births
1950 deaths
Olympic swimmers of Sweden
Swimmers at the 1906 Intercalated Games
Swimmers from Stockholm
Swedish male freestyle swimmers
Stockholms KK swimmers